Iskenderun Technical University (Turkish İskenderun Teknik Üniversitesi, commonly shortened to as İSTE) is a public university located in İskenderun district of Hatay, Turkey. It was formed on March 31, 2015 by the separation from Mustafa Kemal University. 

It is a technical university dedicated to engineering sciences as well as provides education in social sciences and music. As of 2021, the university has seven faculties, one college, seven institutes, five vocational schools and one music school.

History 
Iskenderun Technical University was founded with the Law No. 6640 published in the Official Gazette of the Republic of Turkey on March 31, 2015. As of 2021, it is one of the two universities in Hatay.

Academic units

Faculties 

 Barbaros Hayrettin Faculty of Shipbuilding and Maritime
 Faculty of Marine Sciences and Technology
 Faculty of Aeronautics and Astronautics
 Faculty of Business and Management Sciences
 Faculty of Architecture
 Faculty of Engineering and Natural Sciences
 Faculty of Tourism

Institutes 

 Institute of Engineering and Science
 Institute of Social Sciences
 Institute of Informatics
 Institute of Environment and Marine Sciences
 Institute of Energy
 Institute of Iron and Steel
 Institute of Transporting and Logistics

Vocational schools 

 Dörtyol Vocational School of Health Services
 Dörtyol Vocational School of Higher Education
 Erzin Organized Industrial Zone Vocational School
 Iskenderun Vocational School of Higher Education
 Maritime Vocational School of Higher Education

College 

 Foreign Languages

Music school 

 İskenderun Mustafa Yazıcı Conservatory

See also 

 List of universities in Turkey

References

External links 

 Iskenderun Technical University Official Website (In English)

Technical universities and colleges in Turkey
Educational institutions established in 2015
2015 establishments in Turkey